Violet Graham (1890–1967) was an English stage and film actress. Graham played leading roles in several films of the silent era, often appearing in those of the director Sidney Morgan such as Auld Lang Syne. Graham was in the original cast of the 1909 musical The Arcadians.

Selected filmography
 Jobson's Luck (1913)
 The Charlatan (1916)
 On the Banks of Allan Water (1916)
 Auld Lang Syne (1917)
 A Bid for Fortune (1917)
 The Lackey and the Lady (1919)
 A Man's Shadow (1920)
 The Mystery of Thor Bridge (1923)
 Trainer and Temptress (1925)
 Lily of Laguna (1938)

References

Bibliography
 Low, Rachael. The History of the British Film 1914 - 1918. George Allen & Unwin, 1950.

External links

1890 births
1967 deaths
English stage actresses
English film actresses
English silent film actresses
20th-century English actresses